Emilija Kokić (born 10 May 1968) is a Croatian singer. She was the lead singer of the Croatian pop band Riva, which won the Eurovision Song Contest 1989 for Yugoslavia, with the song Rock Me, just four days before her 21st Birthday. Currently Emilija is a solo artist and Singing teacher in Croatia. She tried her luck at the national  Dora festival, whose winner was to represent Croatia at Eurovision. She came joint 6th at Dora 2008.

At Dora 2011 she was part of the jury and also performed Rock Me.

Biography 
Emilija Kokić was born on 10 May 1968 in Zadar to Vice and Marija Kokić. She has a brother, Nenad.

Discography 

 Emilia (1994)
 100 % Emilia (1995)
 Ostavi trag (1996) 
 S moje strane svemira (1999)
 Ja sam tu (2001)
Halo (2004)
 Čime sam te zaslužila (2008)

Singles

Personal life 
She is married to Miljenko Kokot. They have no children.

References

External links

 Emilija Kokić's official website

1968 births
Living people
21st-century Croatian women singers
Croatian pop singers
Eurovision Song Contest entrants of 1989
Eurovision Song Contest entrants for Yugoslavia
Eurovision Song Contest winners
Musicians from Zadar
20th-century Croatian women singers